Holman Williams (January 30, 1915 in Pensacola, Florida – July 15, 1967) was a world welterweight and middleweight boxing contender. Williams is a member of the infamous Murderers' Row, a group of black fighters who were never able to get a world title shot.

Boxing career
Williams began boxing as an amateur in 1928 as a bantamweight and had a successful 38-bout career. In 1932 he turned pro as a featherweight and would eventually be recognized as one of the most clever welterweights and middleweights of his era.

In his career Williams fought in the Lightweight, welterweight and middleweight divisions, he fought notable champions and contenders such as Cocoa Kid, Charley Burley, Eddie Booker, Bob Satterfield, Archie Moore, Marcel Cerdan and Jake LaMotta.

When the World Colored Middleweight Championship was revived in the early 1940s, Charley Burley, who had been the colored welterweight champ, fought Williams for the title on 14 August 14, 1942 Burley won on a 9th-round TKO, the first time Williams was stopped in his career. Williams won the title on a decision in their rematch on 16 October 1942, then lost the title on 15 January 1943 to the Cocoa Kid in a 12-round decision.

Williams retired with a record of 146–31–11 with 36 knockouts with 1 no contest.

Death
On July 15, 1967 Williams was killed in a fire while asleep in the club where he worked.

Honors
Williams was elected into the World Boxing Hall of Fame in 1996 and elected into the International Boxing Hall of Fame in 2008.

Professional boxing record

See also
Murderers' Row (Boxing)

References

External links
 
 CBZ Bio 
 IBHOF Bio 

1915 births
1967 deaths
Boxers from Florida
International Boxing Hall of Fame inductees
World colored middleweight boxing champions
American male boxers